Shekal Gurab-e Bala (also Romanized as Shekāl Gūrāb-e Bālā; also known as Shaghāl Gūrāb, Shakālgūrāb, Shekāl Gūrāb, Shigāl Gurāb, and Shikil’-Kirab) is a village in Gasht Rural District, in the Central District of Fuman County, Gilan Province, Iran. At the 2006 census, its population was 579, in 144 families.

References 

Populated places in Fuman County